Genoa Township may refer to the following places in the United States:

 Genoa Township, DeKalb County, Illinois
 Genoa Township, Michigan
 Genoa Township, Nance County, Nebraska
 Genoa Township, Delaware County, Ohio
 Genoa Township, Houston, Texas

Township name disambiguation pages